The Battle of Kirkuk was a battle in the city of Kirkuk in northern Iraq between Iraqi Kurdistan and the Islamic State of Iraq and the Levant. On the night of January 29, around 150 ISIL fighters attacked positions south and west of the city of Kirkuk, Iraq, which were temporarily under the control of the Peshmerga. The ISIL offensive began under the cover of dense fog and succeeded in overwhelming Peshmerga positions and seizing the towns of Mala Abdullah, Maryam Beg, Tel Ward and the Maktab Khalid crossing. Parts of the Khabbaz oil fields were also captured, taking 24 workers hostage. At least 25 Peshmerga fighters died including Brig. Gen. Sherko Shwani, commander of the 1st Brigade and the highest ranking head of Peshmerga forces in Kirkuk. Gen. Sherko Shwani was killed after being trapped and shot by attackers, according to another Peshmerga commander. Around 16 other Peshmerga fighters were captured by ISIL, and later killed in a staged execution.

The next day, another senior Peshmerga commander, Gen. Hussein Mansour, commander of the 2nd combat support units in the Kirkuk region was killed by sniper fire while leading an attack against Mala Abdullah village. The Khabbaz oil fields were also retaken by Peshmerga troops. However ISIL fighters set fire to some of the oil wells before it was cleared. Kurdish forces retook 8 villages from ISIL.

References 

Conflicts in 2015
2015 in Iraq
Military operations of the Iraqi Civil War in 2015
Military operations of the War in Iraq (2013–2017) involving the Islamic State of Iraq and the Levant
January 2015 events in Iraq
February 2015 events in Iraq
Battle